Relief, as a military term, refers to the breaking of a siege or an encirclement by an outside force. It may occur in conjunction with a breakout and is one of four possible conclusions of investment, the others being a breakout, surrender or reduction. The force that effects relief is known as the "relieving force" or colloquially "rescue party". Following relief, the town or fortification is said to have been "relieved".

Notable relief forces 

 Immortal 32 (Siege of the Alamo)
 Randy Shughart / Gary Gordon (Battle of Mogadishu)

See also 
Combat search and rescue
Relief in place

References 

Military terminology
Military operations
Siege tactics
Sieges
Military strategy
Siege warfare